Kurt Holobaugh (born September 8, 1986) is an American professional mixed martial artist (MMA) who formerly competed in the Featherweight division of the Ultimate Fighting Championship.

Mixed martial arts

Early career
Holobaugh made his professional MMA debut in March 2011. Over the next year-and-a-half, he amassed an undefeated record of 9 wins and no losses, with all but one of his wins coming by stoppage before the final bell.

Strikeforce
In 2013, Holobaugh joined the Strikeforce organization. He made his debut against Pat Healy at Strikeforce: Marquardt vs. Saffiedine on January 12, 2013. He lost the fight via unanimous decision.

Ultimate Fighting Championship
Following the Strikeforce event, the organization was folded and merged with the Ultimate Fighting Championship. Holobaugh's contract was honored and he made his UFC debut against Steven Siler at UFC 159 on April 27, 2013. He lost the fight by unanimous decision and was subsequently released by the promotion.

Post UFC career
After his UFC release, Holobaugh fought for various independent MMA promotions. He found the most success in Titan Fighting Championships, where he held both the Featherweight Championship and Interim Lightweight Championship.

Ultimate Fighting Championship return
Following an impressive bout on Dana White's Contender Series 1, Holobaugh was brought back to the UFC. He faced Raoni Barcelos at UFC Fight Night: dos Santos vs. Ivanov and lost via knockout in the third round. Despite the loss, the win earned Holobaugh his first Fight of the Night bonus award.

Holobaugh next faced Shane Burgos at UFC 230 on November 3, 2018. He lost the fight via submission in the third round.

Holobaugh faced Thiago Moisés on May 11, 2019 UFC 237. He lost the fight by unanimous decision.

Holobaugh was released by the UFC in December 2019.

Post UFC
Holobaugh faced Joziro Boye at XFC 43 on November 11, 2020. He won the bout via first round TKO.

As the semifinal of XFC Lightweight tournament Holobaugh was initially scheduled to face Scott Hudson at XFC 44 on May 28, 2021. However, Hudson withdrew and was replaced by Jose Luis Verdugo. He won the bout via KO at the beginning of the second round and advanced to the final.

Championships and accomplishments

Mixed martial arts
Ultimate Fighting Championship
Fight of the Night (one time) 
Titan Fighting Championship
Titan FC Featherweight Championship (One time)
Interim Titan FC Lightweight Championship (One time)
 Xtreme Fighting Championships
XFC Louisiana Featherweight Championship (One time)

Mixed martial arts record

|-
|Win
|align=center|19–7 (1)
|Jose Luis Verdugo
|KO (punch)
|XFC 44
|
|align=center|2
|align=center|0:11
|Des Moines, Iowa, United States
|
|- 
|Win
|align=center|18–7 (1)
|Joziro Boye
|TKO (knees and punches)
|XFC 43
|
|align=center|1
|align=center|0:26
|Atlanta, Georgia, United States
|
|-
|Loss
|align=center|17–7 (1)
|Thiago Moisés
|Decision (unanimous)
|UFC 237
|
|align=center|3
|align=center|5:00
|Rio de Janeiro, Brazil
|
|-
|Loss
|align=center|17–6 (1)
|Shane Burgos
|Submission (armbar)
|UFC 230
|
|align=center|1
|align=center|2:11
|New York City, New York, United States
|
|-
|Loss
|align=center|17–5 (1)
|Raoni Barcelos
|KO (punches)
|UFC Fight Night: dos Santos vs. Ivanov
|
|align=center|3
|align=center|1:29
|Boise, Idaho, United States
|
|-
|NC
|align=center|17–4 (1)
|Matt Bessette
|NC (overturned)
|Dana White's Contender Series 1
|
|align=center|1
|align=center|2:59
|Las Vegas, Nevada, United States
|
|-
|Win
|align=center|17–4
|Gesias Cavalcante
|TKO (punches)
|Titan FC 44
|
|align=center|4
|align=center|2:45
|Pembroke Pines, Florida, United States
|
|-
|Win
|align=center|16–4
|Yosdenis Cedeno
|Submission (rear naked choke)
|Titan FC 42
|
|align=center|3
|align=center|1:22
|Coral Gables, Florida, United States
|
|-
|Win
|align=center|15–4
|Luciano dos Santos
|TKO (punches)
|Titan FC 39
|
|align=center|2
|align=center|4:21
|Coral Gables, Florida, United States
|
|-
|Loss
|align=center|14–4
|Magomedrasul Khasbulaev
|Decision (unanimous)
|WFCA 16: Grand Prix Akhmat 2016
|
|align=center|3
|align=center|5:00
|Grozny, Russia
|
|-
|Loss
|align=center|14–3
|Andre Harrison
|Decision (unanimous)
|Titan FC 34
|
|align=center|5
|align=center|5:00
|Kansas City, Missouri, United States
|
|-
|Win
|align=center|14–2
|Desmond Green
|Decision (split)
|Titan FC 33
|
|align=center|5
|align=center|5:00
|Mobile, Alabama, United States
|
|-
|Win
|align=center|13–2
|Lloyd Woodard
|TKO (punches)
|Titan FC 29
|
|align=center|1
|align=center|0:15
|Fayetteville, North Carolina, United States
|
|-
|Win
|align=center|12–2
|Eric Marriott
|Decision (unanimous)
|Titan FC 27
|
|align=center|3
|align=center|5:00
|Kansas City, Kansas, United States
|
|-
|Win
|align=center|11–2
|Calvin Miller
|Submission (rear naked choke)
|XFC: Louisiana
|
|align=center|1
|align=center|2:10
|Ponchatoula, Louisiana, United States
|
|-
|Win
|align=center|10–2
|John LeBlanc
|Submission
|In Ya Face: Caged Warrior Championship 1
|
|align=center|1
|align=center|1:13
|Houma, Louisiana, United States
|
|-
|Loss
|align=center|9–2
|Steven Siler
|Decision (unanimous)
|UFC 159
|
|align=center|3
|align=center|5:00
|Newark, New Jersey, United States
|
|-
|Loss
|align=center|9–1
|Pat Healy
|Decision (unanimous)
|Strikeforce: Marquardt vs. Saffiedine
|
|align=center|3
|align=center|5:00
|Oklahoma City, Oklahoma, United States
|
|-
|Win
|align=center|9–0
|Wesley Dunlap
|KO (punch)
|FFI: Blood and Sand 13
|
|align=center|1
|align=center|1:21
|Biloxi, Mississippi, United States
|
|-
|Win
|align=center|8–0
|Wellington Brito
|TKO (punches)
|Natural Disaster 3
|
|align=center|1
|align=center|3:31
|Denham Springs, Louisiana, United States
|
|-
|Win
|align=center|7–0
|Ronnie Rogers
|Submission (rear naked choke)
|FFI: Blood and Sand 12
|
|align=center|2
|align=center|1:15
|Biloxi, Mississippi, United States
|
|-
|Win
|align=center|6–0
|Will Cruthirds	
|Submission (rear naked choke)
|FFI: Blood and Sand 11
|
|align=center|1
|align=center|1:55
|Biloxi, Mississippi, United States
|
|-
|Win
|align=center|5–0
|J.C. Pennington	
|Submission (triangle choke)
|XFC: Chaos at the Castine Center 2
|
|align=center|3
|align=center|3:12
|Mandeville, Louisiana, United States
|
|-
|Win
|align=center|4–0
|Booker Arthur
|Decision (unanimous)
|XFC: Nightmare on the Northshore
|
|align=center|3
|align=center|5:00
|Mandeville, Louisiana, United States
|
|-
|Win
|align=center|3–0
|Paul Soileau
|Submission (guillotine choke)
|FLABBP - Round 2: Tournament of Champions
|
|align=center|1
|align=center|0:32
|Gonzales, Louisiana, United States
|
|-
|Win
|align=center|2–0
|Phil Daru
|Submission (armbar)
|XFC: Chaos at the Castine Center
|
|align=center|1
|align=center|1:55
|Mandeville, Louisiana, United States
|
|-
|Win
|align=center|1–0
|Derrick Breaux	
|Submission
|In Ya Face: Karnival Karnage
|
|align=center|1
|align=center|0:39
|Houma, Louisiana, United States
|
|}

References

External links
 

1986 births
American male mixed martial artists
Featherweight mixed martial artists
Mixed martial artists utilizing Brazilian jiu-jitsu
Living people
People from Livingston Parish, Louisiana
Mixed martial artists from Louisiana
Ultimate Fighting Championship male fighters
American practitioners of Brazilian jiu-jitsu
People awarded a black belt in Brazilian jiu-jitsu